Richard Page is a former Conservative Member of Parliament in the United Kingdom.

Richard Page may also refer to:
Richard Page (musician) (born 1953), lead singer and bassist in 1980s US band Mr. Mister
Richard Page (courtier) (died 1548), gentleman of the Privy Chamber at the court of Henry VIII of England
Richard Lucian Page (1807–1901), United States Navy officer
Richard Page (professor), professor of medicine
Richard Page (cricketer) (1910–2006), English cricketer and British Army officer
Rich Page, manager of the Lisa group at Apple Computer in the 1980s

See also
Richard Paige, penname used by writer Dean Koontz
Richard G. L. Paige (1846–1904), member of the Virginia House of Delegates